Noon (Non, None, Serer-Noon, Serer-Non) is a Cangin language of Senegal spoken in the Thiès region (14°47'0"N / 16°55'0"W). There is an estimated population of 10,000- 50,000 speakers worldwide, rendering this language to be vulnerable. Ethnologue reports that it is 84% cognate (and 68% intelligible) with Lehar, essentially a divergent dialect, and 68% cognate with the other Cangin languages.

The Noon people identify themselves ethnically as Serer. However, their language, often called Serer-Noon on the assumption that it is a Serer dialect, is not closely related to the principal language of the Serer population, Serer-Sine.

Status
Like many of the local languages in Senegal, the Noon language is officially recognized as one of the national languages of country.

Orthography
The Noon language is written using the Latin alphabet. In 2005, a decree was passed by the Senegalese Government in order to regulate the spelling to Noon. It has been proposed that there are 47 letters that are used when writing in Noon, listed below (in two sets, for convenience).

Consonants
The Noon language contains 27 consonants. Note that the glottal stop is not written at the beginning of the word, and it has no separate form for upper-case letters. The pre-nasalized occlusive marking is shown explicitly like in the following symbols, mb, nd, ñj, ŋg.  In addition, the used nasal quality is justified by the enunciation point of the occlusive it precedes.

Noon, like other Senegalese languages, gives the possibility of extensive and varied combinations within its large graphic representation (ñ, ŋ). Twin consonants are possible within words between vowels and are noted by two identical letters, such as ɓɓ, cc, ff, hh, kk, ll, mm, nn, pp, ss, tt, ww, yy. However, this excludes the consonants b, d, g, j, ɗ, ƴ, ñ, and those that are pre-nasalized occlusives. Additionally, the "ɗ" letter does not exist in a word as well as in final voiced stops using the letters b, d, g and j. Also, in Noon, a long vowel is represented by a digraph that is considered a letter, while a geminate consonant is interpreted as a series of two identical letters.

Vowels 
The Noon language contains 20 vowels. Dropped vowels (- ATR) are symbolized by the letters: a, e, i, o, u; and tense matches (+ ATR) are marked with letters possessing diacritics: ë, é, í, ó, ú. Long vowels are represented by two-lettered symbols: aa, ee, ii, oo uu. In the case of tense vowels, only the first letter is marked by a diacritical mark, ëe, ée, íi, óo, úu. A long vowel is considered a single letter, represented by a digraph.

Capitalization Rules 
In general, there are three rules regarding capitalization in Noon. Much like other languages, they capitalize letters at the beginning of sentences and names.

 Rule 1. An uppercase is used at the beginning of each enunciation point, and after each interrogation point (question mark), exclamation point, or the beginning of a quotation after a colon.
 Example: Ɓa haydoh këyitcaa hen, ɓa ee'tarica, kúmaandagaa an: «Yugat! Ɗú ɗekoh!» which translates to, 'As soon as they had searched the papers, they gave them to him, and the commander said: "Sit down! Be quiet!"
 Rule 2. The first letter of any personal name, family, country, city, etc. are indicated by an uppercase letter.
 Example: Senegaal is indicative of 'Senegal' or Caañaak is indicative of 'Thiès Rule 3. For franchise or business names beginning with ki-, the letter that precedes the prefix ki- is often uppercased while the prefix itself is lowercased. Although, there is an exception if the prefix ki- appears in the beginning of a phrase or enunciation point.
 Example: 'kiToŋgol' translates to, 'this year'; Whereas, if the phrase was in the beginning of an enunciation point, it would be rendered 'KiToŋgol' to mean 'This year... Phonology 
 Vowels 
In Noon, the vocalic system contains twenty phonemes: 10 short and 10 long vowels.

Consonants
In Noon, the consonantal system contains 22 phonemes.

 Grammar 
In Noon, the division of words is based on grammatical rules that are inherent in the language. The language undergoes many morphological changes, thus the language treats certain morphemes as being part of a single or key word, making them dependent. These morphemes are treated as prefixes that do not carry any independent meaning in itself, but are used for grammatical context.Ki-

The infinitive ki- is prefixed to the subject of the verb.

Examples:

kiñam 'to eatki'on 'to givekilímu 'to be bornkiɗúukool 'to be sickDi-

The adverb di- is prefixed. However, when bi- is used as a conjunction, it is written separately.

Example:

Adverb: tani'in dijëfí' translates to, 'he is much betterConjunction: tani'in bi jof also translates to, 'he is much better Class Markers 
Class Markers such as wi-,fi-,mi-, etc. are prefixed to the subject of the adjective.

Examples:

kaan fi'as 'a new househa'mun yi'as 'a new owner;

túuƴ wimórí' 'a beautiful room Object Pronouns 
Object pronouns are suffixed to a verb due to morphological changes that appear with most personal object pronouns (with the exception of the 3rd person plural), where the initial consonant of morpheme is adapted to the final consonant of the verb. Similarly, other object pronouns are also linked as suffixes when they appear with a preposition. However, there is an exception with the preposition ga- which is never suffixed to the verb.

Examples:

hottoo 'he sees mehottaa 'he sees you' (informal)

hotti 'he sees him (a man)hottíi 'he sees us (but not you)hottuu 'he sees us (you included)hottúu 'he sees you' (formal or plural)

hotɓa 'he sees them (the men)hotfa 'he sees it (the house)hotca 'he sees them (the houses)Ga- preposition exception:

Ñamaa ga! 'Eat it!yaa tík gaɗa 'the followingFurthermore, the same object pronouns are suffixed to prepositions.

Example:

'Mi hay naraa kitaam.'  translates to, 'I will go with you Possessive Pronouns 
The possessive pronouns in Noon are suffixed to a name that appears after the definite article. The decision to treat these pronouns as suffixes, and not as an independent words that are formed by the preposition ga- followed by the object pronoun, has been made so that the possessive pronouns possess a  complementary distribution. This means, that the names are determined by relational possessive pronouns, or by possessive pronouns, depending on the character's name. Another reason for this suffix is the first person singular form of -goo (used in contraction with garoo) which appears only in cases of possessive pronouns, and never with the preposition ga-.

Examples:

kowkiigoo 'my childkowkiigaraa 'your child' (informal)

kowkiigari 'his/her childkowkiigaríi 'our childkowkiigaruu 'our child'''kowkiigarúu 'your child' (formal or plural)kowkiigaɓa 'their childtowtiigaca 'their fruits

Note that the preposition ga- is not suffixed to a word. Also note, that when ga- or garoo is used in the 1st person singular, it changes the form.

Example:Feetaa newin gaɓa. 'They liked the party.Feetaa newin garoo. 'I liked the party.

Possessive pronouns that are relational are suffixed to the noted topic because of morphophonological changes that concern the assimilation of the initial consonant of the pronoun to the final consonant of the name (in the 1st person singular tense or the 1st and 2nd person plural tense).

Examples:yaakkoo 'my big brotheryaakfu 'your big brother' (informal)yaakci 'his big brotheryaakkíi 'our big brotheryaakkuu 'our big brotheryaakkúu 'your big brother' (formal or plural)yaakɓa 'their big brother

 Definite Articles 
The definite articles -ii, -um and -aa are suffixed, in conjunction with a class marker, to an indicative name or place.

Examples:hal halii 'the door (here)oomaa oomaanaa 'the child (there)kow kowkaa 'the child (there)pe' pe'faa 'the goat (there)misoo' misoorum 'the headscarf (near to you)tuhaan tuhaantii 'the bongos (here)

Additionally, definite articles are suffixed to adjectives in the same manner that names are suffixed in Noon.

Examples:túuyaa wi'aswaa 'the new room (there)kaanfii fimo'tafii 'the beautiful home (here)kubaaykii jisúusúusjii 'the black puppy (here)tediktaa tihoo'tataa 'the large trees (there)

 Subordinate Clauses 
In Noon, the suffix -(n)aa is indicative of a subordinate clause and -ɗa is indicative of a relative subordinate clause. The reasons for treating these morphemes as suffixes are due to morphophonological changes to - (n)aa, and their grammatical functions in words for both - (n)aa and -ɗa . The insertion of a nasal vowel in a word placed at the ending of a proposal indicates that the morpheme is a phonological word with the word that it precedes. We also see glottalized consonants and certain nasal consonants change in subordinate clauses. Both morphemes - (n)aa and -ɗa carry grammatical meaning rather than lexical meaning as they indicate the entire proposition, describing its function in the sentence.

Examples:Fu hayaa, ɗuu ñam. 'We will eat, when you come' (worded in the form: 'When you come, we will eat.')Fu hot kowkaanaa, wo'aari ya hay. 'If you see his son, tell him to come.However, unlike -ɗa, which is a morpheme indicative of a proposal, there is an adverb ɗa which can translate to 'alone'  or like this/that'. You can note the difference between the two forms, as the adverb is always separated, since it carries an independent lexical meaning.

Example:Maŋgoocaa ñamsi ɗa. 'The mangoes are eaten alone Interrogative Clauses 
In Noon, the suffix -(n)e is used to indicate general interrogative clauses.

Examples:

Fu hay kihay kuwise? 'Are you coming tomorrow?Fu hotin kowkiigoone? 'Have you seen my child?For an alternative interrogative clause, the suffix -(n)oo is used.

Examples:

''Fu waa' ki'an músúnoo miis? 'Would you like water or milk to drink?' (written in the form: 'Would you like to drink water or milk?Fu en ga foohoo ga ɗuuƴ? 'Are you outside or inside?

In vocative cases, the suffix -(n)óo is suffixed to a name.

Example:Bañóo! translates to, 'Hell!

Numeral System 
Noon has a quinary-decimal system. The alternative form for 'one', wɪtnɔː, is only used in the counting process. Actually, it is very common for the Noon to use pure Wolof or French when counting above the number from 100 onwards.

Notes

Languages of Senegal
Cangin languages